Maesteg Harlequins RFC is a rugby union team from the town of Maesteg, Wales. The Maesteg Harlequins were founded in 1899, their first captain being Tom Hopkins. They have reformed under different guises but for the majority of their 113 years they have been known as Maesteg Harlequins. The club is a member of the Welsh Rugby Union having been made full members in 1987.

Club honours
 WRU National League 1 West Central Champions 2017-2018
 WRU West Championship Play-Off     Winners   2017-2018
 WRU National League 2 West Central Champions 2013-2014
 WRU National League 3 West Central Champions 2011-2012
 WRU National League 3 West Central Champions 2004-2005
 WRU National League 4 West Central Champions 2010-2011 
 WRU National League 5 West Central Champions 2001–2002
 WRU National League 6 West Central Champions 2000–2001 
 WRU National League 7 West Central Champions 1997–1998
 Glamorgan County Silver Ball Winners:        2000–2001 & 2010-2011
 Glamorgan County Silver Ball Finalists:      2011-2012 & 2017-2018
 Glamorgan County President’s Cup Winners:    2000–2001 & 2010-2011
 Glamorgan County President’s Cup Finalists:  1997-1998
 Hancocks HB Trophy Winners:                  1997 – 1998
 Glamorgan County 'Performance of the Year':  1997 – 1998
 WRU SWALEC National Bowl Finalists:          2010-2011
 Central Glamorgan Cup Finalists:             1995–1996, 1997–1998 & 2001–2002
 Wistech Central Glamorgan League 3 Runner-up 1989-1990
 Wistech Central Glamorgan League 2 Runner-up 1990-1991
 Maesteg and District Champions               1899-1900
 Mid-Glam D.R.U. Division 1 Winners           2013-2014
 Mid-Glam D.R.U. Div 1 Play-off Winners       2013-2014
 Mid-Glam D.R.U. Division Two Winners:        1996 – 1997
 Mid-Glam D.R.U. ‘Lyn Sports’ Cup Winners:    1977 – 1978
 Mid-Glam D.R.U. ‘Lyn Sports’ Cup Finalists:  2006–2007; 2005 – 2006, 2004–2005 & 2003–2004
 Mid-Glam D.R.U. Plate Finalists              2013-2014
 Maesteg and District Champions               1899-1900

Seven-a-Side: 				             
 Mid-Glamorgan DRU Sevens Winners             1961
 Bedlinog Sevens Winners                      1988
 Le Havre Sevens Winners                      1975
 Evs 7s Plate Winners                         2011 & 2014

External links
 Maesteg Quins Rugby Football Club

References

Welsh rugby union teams
Maesteg